Radu Leon (? – 1669) was ruler of Wallachia from 1664 to 1669. He had the byname Radu the Oyster-seller.

Son of Wallachian ruler Leon Tomșa, and putative grandson of Ștefan Tomșa, ruler of Moldavia, Radu Leon replaced the deposed Grigore I Ghica in December 1664.

Supposedly barely able to speak Romanian, Radu's authority relied on the support of the Phanariots, and especially the Cantacuzino family. Șerban Cantacuzino, later ruler of Wallachia, served as his chamberlain, and Draghici Cantacuzino commanded Radu's armies.

Anti-Greek protests beginning in December 1668 led to Radu's downfall in March 1669 and replacement by Antonie Vodă din Popești.

References

Rulers of Wallachia
17th-century monarchs in Europe
Year of death unknown
Year of birth unknown